Talma is an unincorporated community in Newcastle Township, Fulton County, Indiana.

Geography and history
Talma is located at  where Redinger Ditch meets the Tippecanoe River. Indiana State Road 25 passes northeast through Talma, which is located about halfway between Rochester and Mentone.

The town was founded by Asa Coplen on June 13, 1851, and was named "Bloomingsburg". A petition was later filed to change the name because the United States Post Office wanted a shorter name for it. A local contest was held, and William Roundtree Kubley found the winning entry, Talma, in a crossword puzzle.

Talma was severely damaged by a tornado on April 3, 1974. This shut down the high school that was slated to be consolidated into Tippecanoe Valley High School later that year.

Economy
Talma was home to Talma Fasteners, a manufacturer of screws and bolts and was certified by ISO 9001: 2000. The plant closed in 2014. There is also Mennonite-run Ramer's Hardwood Furniture, Sunnybrook Greenhouses, Snipes Farms, HH Diesel and OBS creative services. Most residents work in Rochester, Argos, or Mentone.

References

Sources
 Fulton County Historical Society

Unincorporated communities in Fulton County, Indiana
Unincorporated communities in Indiana